Sung Noen is a district (amphoe) in western part of Nakhon Ratchasima province, northeastern Thailand.

History
The  literal translation of Sung Noen is 'high hills', as the area has two high (sung) hills (noen) beside a pond, and has never been flooded. Sung Noen was the location of two ancient cities, Mueang Sema and Khorakha (Khorat) Pura. 

Historians believe that Sung Noen is Mueang Rat, a city under the rule of Pho Khun Pha Mueang, one of the rulers who played a great role in establishing the Sukhothai Kingdom, at the beginning of Thai history.

When the Northeastern railway was finished in 1901, the community consisting of Ban Sung Noen grew due to the passing of the railway. Thus the government raised Sung Noen to district status.

Geography
Neighbouring districts are (from the north clockwise) Dan Khun Thot, Kham Thale So, Mueang Nakhon Ratchasima, Pak Thong Chai, Wang Nam Khiao and Sikhio.

Administration

Central administration 
Sung Noen is divided into 11 subdistricts (tambons), which are further subdivided into 127 administrative villages (mubans).

Local administration 
There are two subdistrict municipalities (thesaban tambons) in the district:
 Kut Chik consisting of parts of subdistricts Na Klang, Kut Chik.
 Sung Noen consisting of parts of subdistrict Sung Noen.

There are 11 subdistrict administrative organizations (SAO) in the district:
 Sung Noen consisting of parts of subdistrict Sung Noen.
 Sema consisting of subdistrict Sema.
 Khorat consisting of subdistrict Khorat.
 Bung Khilek consisting of subdistrict Bung Khilek.
 Non Kha consisting of subdistrict Non Kha.
 Khong Yang consisting of subdistrict Khong Yang.
 Makluea Kao consisting of subdistrict Makluea Kao.
 Makluea Mai consisting of subdistrict Makluea Mai.
 Na Klang consisting of parts of Na Klang.
 Nong Takai consisting of subdistrict Nong Takai.
 Kut Chik consisting of parts of subdistrict Kut Chik.

See also 
 Bai sema

Notes

References

External links
amphoe.com

Sung Noen